The Pacifica is a residential skyscraper in Auckland, New Zealand. Completed in 2020, it is the tallest residential building in New Zealand, surpassing The Metropolis, but is set to be overtaken in 2024 by the  Seascape. The top two floors of the building contained a penthouse that sold for 40 million making it the most expensive apartment ever sold in New Zealand. In June 2021, The Pacifica won "Best Residential High Rise Development New Zealand" and "Best Apartment / Condominium New Zealand" in the international property awards.

See also 
 List of tallest buildings in Oceania
 List of tallest buildings in Auckland
 List of tallest structures in New Zealand

References

Skyscrapers in Auckland
2020 establishments in New Zealand
Auckland CBD